Sinaloa, officially El , is one of the 31 states which, along with Mexico City, comprise the Federal Entities of Mexico. It is divided into 18 municipalities and its capital city is Culiacán Rosales.

It is located in northwest Mexico, and is bordered by the states of Sonora to the north, Chihuahua and Durango to the east (separated from them by the Sierra Madre Occidental) and Nayarit to the south. To the west, Sinaloa faces Baja California Sur across the Gulf of California. In addition to the capital city, the state's important cities include Mazatlán and Los Mochis.

History

Sinaloa belongs to the northern limit of Mesoamerica. From the Fuerte River to the north is the region known as Aridoamerica, which includes the desert and arid places of northern Mexico. Before European contact, the territory of Sinaloa was inhabited by groups such as the Cahitas, the Tahues, the Acaxees, the Xiximes, the Totorames, the Achires and the Guasaves.

In 1531, Nuño Beltrán de Guzmán, with a force of over 10,000 men, established a Spanish and allied Indian outpost at San Miguel de Culiacán. Over the next decade, the Cahíta suffered severe depopulation from conquest, smallpox and other diseases brought by Europeans.

The Spanish organized Sinaloa as part of the gobierno of Nueva Galicia. In 1564, the area was realigned: the area of Culiacán and Cosalá remained in control of Nueva Galicia, while the areas to the north, south and west were made part of the newly formed Nueva Vizcaya province, making the Culiacán area an exclave of Nueva Galicia. The first capital of Nueva Vizcaya was located in San Sebastián, near Copala, but was moved to Durango in 1583.

Starting in 1599, Jesuit missionaries spread out from a base at what is now Sinaloa de Leyva and by 1610, the Spanish influence had been extended to the northern edge of Sinaloa. In 1601, the Jesuits' movement into the eastern part of Sinaloa led to the Acaxee going to war. The Spanish eventually managed to reassert authority in the Sierra Madre Occidental region and executed 48 Acaxee leaders.

After the Mexican War of independence, Sinaloa was joined with Sonora as Estado de Occidente, but became a separate, sovereign state in 1830. The Porfiriato era was marked by the administration of Francisco Cañedo, who served multiple non-consecutive terms from 1877 to 1909. After the Mexican Revolultion, infrastructure projects and land reform consolidated the agrarian sector, which led to the state being named "the granary of Mexico".

Geography
The coastal plain is a narrow strip of land that stretches along the length of the state and lies between the Gulf of California and the foothills of the Sierra Madre Occidental mountain range, which dominates the eastern part of the state. Sinaloa is traversed by many rivers, which carve broad valleys into the foothills. The largest of these rivers are the Culiacán, Fuerte, and Sinaloa.

Sinaloa has a warm climate on the coast; moderately warm climate in the valleys and foothills; moderately cold in the lower mountains, and cold in the higher elevations. Its weather characteristics vary from subtropical and tropical, found on coastal plains, to cold in the nearby mountains. Its average annual precipitation is 790 millimetres.

Numerous species of plants and animals are found within Sinaloa. Notable among the tree species is the elephant tree, Bursera microphylla.

Demography

According to the 2020 census, Sinaloa is home to 3,026,943 inhabitants, 60% of whom reside in the capital city of Culiacán and the municipalities of Mazatlán and Ahome. It is a young state in terms of population, 56% of which is younger than 30 years of age.

Other demographic particulars report 87% of the state practices the Catholic faith. Also, 1% of those over five years of age speak an indigenous language alongside Spanish; the main indigenous ethnic group still residing in the state is the Mayo or "Yoreme" (Cáhita language) people. Life expectancy in the state follows the national tendency of higher rates for women than men, a difference of almost five years in the case of Sinaloa, at 72.5 and 77.4 years respectively.

In ethnic composition, Sinaloa has received large historic waves of immigration from Europe (mainly Spain, the United Kingdom, Ireland, France, Germany, Austria, Italy and Russia) and Asia (namely China, Japan, the Philippines, Lebanon and Syria). The latter two countries also make up most of the Arab Mexican community in the state. In recent years, retirees from the U.S., Canada and South America have arrived and made Sinaloa their home. 

There was also a sizable influx of Ashkenazi and Sephardi Jews in the first decades of the twentieth century.

Greeks form a notable presence in Sinaloa, where one can find local cuisine with kalamari and a few Greek Orthodox churches along the state's coast.

According to the 2020 Census, 1.39% of Sinaloa's population identified as Black, Afro-Mexican, or having African descent.

Sinaloenses have moved to the United States in large numbers since 1970; a large community lives in the twin towns of Indio, California and Coachella, California about 25 miles east of the resort city of Palm Springs, California in the Colorado Desert of Southern California.

Economy
The main economic activities of Sinaloa are agriculture, fishing, livestock breeding, tourism and food processing. Sinaloa has on its license plates the image of a tomato, as the state is widely recognized for harvesting this particular fruit in great abundance from Los Mochis in the North to Culiacán in the central region of the state. Agriculture produce aside from tomatoes include cotton, beans, corn, wheat, sorghum, potatoes, soybeans, mangos, sugarcane, peanuts and squash. Sinaloa is the most prominent state in Mexico in terms of agriculture and is known as "Mexico's breadbasket". Additionally, Sinaloa has the second largest fishing fleet in the country. Livestock produces meat, sausages, cheese, milk as well as sour cream.

Education
In terms of education, average schooling reaches 8.27 years; 4.2% of those over 15 years of age are illiterate, and 3.18% of children under 14 years of age do not attend school.

Institutions of higher education include Universidad Autónoma de Sinaloa, TecMilenio University, Universidad Politécnica de Sinaloa, Universidad Politécnica del Mar y la Sierra, Universidad Politécnica del Valle del Evora, Universidad Autónoma de Durango, Instituto Tecnológico Superior de Sinaloa, Universidad Autónoma de Occidente and Universidad Casa Blanca.

Government and politics
The current governor of Sinaloa is Rubén Rocha Moya. The state is represented in the Mexican Congress by three Senators in the upper house and fourteen federal deputies in the lower house.

Municipalities 
Sinaloa is divided into 18 municipalities. Each municipality has a city council, headed by the municipal president. The aforementioned positions have a duration of three years.

The state's major cities include the capital and largest city, Culiacán, Mazatlán, a famous tourist resort and destination, and Los Mochis, an agricultural hub in Northwestern Mexico. Other cities include Guasave, Guamúchil, Escuinapa, El Fuerte, Sinaloa de Leyva, El Rosario, San Ignacio de Piaxtla and Choix.

Culture

Culturally, Sinaloa is part of Northern Mexico. Famous entertainers from the state include actor Pedro Infante, born in Mazatlán; singer Ana Gabriel, born in Guamúchil; singer and actress Lola Beltrán from Rosario; Cruz Lizárraga, the founder of Banda el Recodo; baseball player Jorge Orta, from Mazatlán; actress/comedian/singer Sheyla Tadeo, born in Culiacán; actress Sabine Moussier; actress/singer Lorena Herrera, from Mazatlán; and singer-songwriter Chalino Sánchez, from Las Flechas, Culiacán.

Music 
The state is known for its popular styles of music banda and norteño. Banda was established in the early 1920s, influenced by the organological style of the European fanfare, and incorporating traditional sones, ranchera, corrido, polka, waltz, mazurka and schottische predominate, as well as more contemporary genres such as cumbia.

The first bandas were formed by members of military and municipal bands who settled in the Sierra Madre Occidental during the Mexican Revolution, and were influenced by traditional Yoreme music.

Cuisine 
Its rich cuisine is well known for its variety particularly in regard to mariscos (seafood) and vegetables. Famous dishes include aguachile. Sinaloan sushi is a popular dish.

Media 
Newspapers of Sinaloa include: El Debate de Culiacán, El Debate de Guamúchil, El Debate de Guasave, El Debate de los Mochis, El Debate de Mazatlán, El Sol de Culiacán, El Sol de Sinaloa, La I Noticias para Mí Culiacán, Noroeste (Culiacán), Noroeste de Mazatlán, and Primera Hora.

Sports 
Sinaloa is one of the few places where the ancient Mesoamerican ballgame is still played, in a handful of small, rural communities not far from Mazatlán. The ritual ballgame was central in the society, religion and cosmology of all the great Mesoamerican cultures including the Mixtecs, Aztecs, and Maya. The Sinaloa version of the game is called ulama and is very similar to the original. There are efforts to preserve this 3500-year-old unique tradition by supporting the communities and children who play it.

The state is home to several baseball teams such as Tomateros de Culiacán, Venados de Mazatlán, Cañeros de Los Mochis and Algodoneros de Guasave which take part in the Mexican Pacific League.

Organized crime 
The Sinaloa Cartel (Cártel de Sinaloa or CDS) has significantly influenced the culture of Sinaloa. The cartel is reportedly the largest drug trafficking, money laundering and organized crime syndicate in the Americas; it is based in the city of Culiacán, Sinaloa.

Notable residents

Carlos Bojórquez – Boxer
Julio César Chávez – Six time World Boxing Champion
Jorge Orta – Major League Baseball player
Jorge Arce – Boxer and flyweight champion
Cristobal Arreola – Boxer
Luis Ayala – Major League Baseball player
Sandra Avila Beltrán – Drug Lord
Lola Beltrán – Actress and Ranchera singer
Perla Beltrán Acosta – Beauty queen, model and entrepreneur
Paul Aguilar — Football Player
Heraclio Bernal – Social Agitator/Folk Hero
Jared Borgetti – Football player
Omar Bravo – Football player
Ariel Camacho – Norteño Singer/Folk Songs
Javier Valdez Cárdenas – Journalist
Oscar Dautt – Football player
Iván Estrada – Football player
Carlos Fierro – Football player
Rodolfo Fierro - Revolutionary Fighter
Ana Gabriel – Singer
Pedro Avilés Pérez – Drug Lord
Joaquín Guzmán Loera – Former leader and co-founder of the Sinaloa Cartel.
Miguel Ángel Félix Gallardo – Former leader and co-founder of the Guadalajara Cartel.
Rafael Caro Quintero – Former leader and founder of the Sonora Cartel.
Amado Carrillo Fuentes – Former leader and co-founder of the Juárez Cartel.
Alfredo Beltrán-Leyva – Leader and co-founder of the Beltrán-Leyva Organization.
Héctor Luis Palma Salazar – Former leader and co-founder of the Sinaloa Cartel. 
Ismael Zambada García – Leader of the Sinaloa Cartel.
Benjamín Arellano Félix – Former leader and co-founder of the Tijuana Cartel (Arellano Félix Organization.)
Ramón Arellano Félix – Former leader and co-founder of the Tijuana Cartel (Arellano Félix Organization.)
Ernesto Fonseca Carrillo – Former leader and co-founder of the Guadalajara Cartel.
Enedina Arellano Félix – Leader and co-founder of the Tijuana Cartel (Arellano Félix Organization.)
Lorena Herrera – Actress
Pedro Infante – Singer and actor
Francisco Labastida – Economist and politician affiliated to the PRI
Horacio Llamas – Basketball player
Los Tigres del Norte – Norteño music group
Banda el Recodo –  Banda Sinaloense
Jesús Malverde – Folklore hero
Alberto Medina – Football player
César Millán – TV personality and professional dog trainer
Fernando Montiel – Boxer
Héctor Moreno – Football player
Sabine Moussier – Actress
Patricia Navidad – Actress and singer
Antonio Osuna – Major League Baseball player
Roberto Osuna – Major League Baseball player
Óliver Pérez – Major League Baseball player
Fausto Pinto – Football player
Julio Preciado – Singer
José Luis Ramírez – Boxer
Sara Ramírez – Actress
Paul Rodriguez – Comedian
Aurelio Rodríguez – Major League Baseball player
Dennys Reyes – Major League Baseball player
Sheyla Tadeo –  Actress and comedian
María del Rosario Espinoza – Taekwondo Olympic medalist
Roberto Tapia – Singer
Julio Urías – Major League Baseball player
José Urquidy – Major League Baseball player
Chayito Valdez – Folk singer
Chalino Sánchez – Singer

Banda MS - Banda Sinaloense 
Arrolladora Banda el Limón - Banda Sinaloense 
Banda Los Recoditos - Banda Sinaloense 
José Manuel López Castro - Norteño Singer

See also

Sinaloa Cartel
Las Labradas, an archaeological site located in southern Sinaloa

Notes

References
 C. Michael Hogan. 2009. Elephant Tree: Bursera microphylla, GlobalTwitcher.com, ed. N. Stromberg
 Asociacion de Gestores del Patrimonio Historico y Cultural de Mazatlán. 2009. The Mesoamerican Ballgame-Ulama

External links

 
The History of Indigenous Sinaloa
PBS Frontline: The place Mexico's drug kingpins call home

 
States of Mexico
States and territories established in 1831
1831 establishments in Mexico